Cloyne GAA club is located in the small town of Cloyne in County Cork, Ireland. The club plays in the Imokilly division of Cork GAA. Founded in 1887 they have yet to win a Cork Senior Hurling Championship title and have the dubious distinction of losing in 3 successive finals (2004, 2005 and 2006). Christy Ring one of their most famous players played for the team before moving to play for Glen Rovers in 1941 was often called The Wizard of Cloyne for his hurling prowess and a statue commemorating him stands in the centre of the town.

Honours
Relegated in 2012 to Premier intermediate hurling status.

 Cork Senior Hurling Championship Beaten finalists 2004, 2005, 2006
 Cork Intermediate Hurling Championship Winners (3) 1966, 1970, 1997  Beaten finalists 1913, 1992, 1996
 Cork Junior Hurling Championship Winners (3) 1939, 1961, 1987  | Runners-Up 1944, 1960
 Cork Senior Hurling League Winners (1) 1998
 Cork Minor Hurling Championship Winners (6) 1938, 1949, 1984, 1987, 1988, 1989 (with Midleton)
 Cork Minor B Hurling Championship Winner (1) 2005
 East Cork Junior A Hurling Championship Winners (9) 1938, 1939, 1944, 1958, 1960, 1961, 1976, 1986, 1987  | Runners-Up 1945, 1959, 1974, 1978
 East Cork Junior A Football Championship Winners (6) 1976, 2001, 2008, 2009, 2010, 2016  | Runners-Up 1980
 Féile na nGael Division 5  Winners (1) 2006

History
Cloyne hurling and football club is one of the oldest clubs in Cork county in fact one of the oldest in the country. The first recorded game involving a Cloyne team took place in late November 1887 when they played Little Island in the Aghada hurling tournament, the result of which is not known thus the Cloyne GAA club entered the recorded era almost exactly three years after the foundation of the Gaelic Athletic Association.

Notable players
 Christy Ring
 Diarmuid O'Sullivan
 Donal Óg Cusack
 Conor Cusack
 Paudie O'Sullivan

References

External links
Cork GAA site
Cloyne GAA site

Gaelic games clubs in County Cork
Hurling clubs in County Cork
Gaelic football clubs in County Cork